Cian Ducrot is an Irish singer-songwriter. He rose to prominence with his single "All for You", which gained popularity in 2022 via TikTok and ultimately peaked at number 19 on the UK Singles Chart. His following single, "I'll Be Waiting", has so far peaked at number 16.

Early life
Ducrot grew up in Cork, Ireland, where his mother was a concert pianist and flautist. Ducrot joined musicals and drama clubs during his school years.

Ducrot was accepted to study at the Royal Academy of Music in London on a full scholarship where he studied classical flute.

Career

2018–2020: Royal Academy of Music and Started in College
A couple of years into his schooling in London, Ducrot took a trip Los Angeles, that inspired him to pursue his dream of becoming a pop artist instead of a classical flautist. He left school and moved back to Ireland to pursue his dream. With money being tight, he would often couch surf between London and Los Angeles. The product of these experiences was his debut release mixtape, Started in College, which was released in June 2020.

Ducrot said, "I started learning how to produce in school. It was in college that I started taking music seriously and that's when I found out how I could release music and how I could put my music out there and really work to the point where my production and my writing was at a place where I was happy enough with it to put them out. And so that's what started in college was for me...It really embodies what happened to me during those two years, like, all of the different things from falling in love to falling out of love." 
 
Following its release, Ducrot was signed by Darkroom/Interscope Records.

2021–present: Make Believe
In February 2021, Ducrot released his debut single, "Not Usually Like This". This was followed by "Crocodiles" in March 2021, which he says is about "losing a friend and being both angry and hurt about it". 
 
In May 2021, Ducrot released "Know Me Again" featuring Canadian artist Cate. This was followed by "Chewing Gum" in August, "Make Believe" in September "Hello Gorgeous" in November and "Happier Without Me" in December 2021.

On 9 December 2021, Durcrot released his debut extended play Make Believe, which included all the singles released throughout the year. Speaking about the EP, Ducrot said "Making this EP was a very strange but amazing process for me as half of the songs were written before I even knew I was making an EP. It's been years in the making and pulls from so many moments in my life. I have loved discovering new directions and new music and also rediscovering old songs and bringing them to life and, most of all, discovering myself and what matters to me. Most of the EP was made throughout lockdown and the pandemic so it was a lot of days and nights alone and of course on the other side of the planet away from my team at Darkroom & Interscope."

In April 2022, Ducrot released "All for You", which became his first charting single, peaking at number 2 in Ireland and number 19 in the United Kingdom. A version featuring Ella Henderson was released in August 2022.

In November 2022, Ducrot released "I'll Be Waiting", which began climbing national charts in early 2023.
 
In December 2022, Ducrot released a cover of "Hallelujah". In a live video of the song, the musician is joined by the Royal Northern College of Music Student Choir. He was announced as the support act for Ed Sheeran on his 4 date UK tour, ahead of Sheeran's upcoming album Subtract.

Discography

Extended plays

Mixtapes

Singles

Tours 
Supporting
Everything I Didn't Say supporting Ella Henderson (2022)
Ed Sheeran's 2023 mini-tour (April 2023)

References

External links
 
 

Living people
21st-century Irish male singers
21st-century Irish singers
1997 births